Phi Sigma Phi,() is a national fraternity in the United States founded on July 30, 1988 in South Bend, Indiana by chapters formerly of Phi Sigma Epsilon that declined to participate in that fraternity's merger into Phi Sigma Kappa. There are currently 5 active chapters of Phi Sigma Phi nationwide. The current National President is University of Wisconsin-Stevens Point Alumn Joshua Finch.

History
The foundation for Phi Sigma Phi stems from the  merger between Phi Sigma Epsilon and Phi Sigma Kappa.  After this merger, a small group of Phi Sigma Epsilon alumni and then-current undergraduate collegians decided not to participate with the new fraternity, instead electing to form their own national fraternity.  Historically,   was founded as an evolution of ideals and dedication to independence and freedom of choice. On , in South Bend, Indiana, Phi Sigma Phi National Fraternity, Inc. was formally organized to serve as a national organization.

Leading this small group of chapters into the formation of a new national fraternity were former Phi Sigma Epsilon alumni who were elected to serve as Phi Sigma Phi's first National Council.

The current National Council of Phi Sigma Phi includes:
 Joshua Finch (National President)
 Aaron Bestul (National Vice-President)
 Mike Brennan (National Vice-President)
 Paul Jarosh (National Vice-President)
 Joe Sharpe (National Vice-President)
 Shawn Head (National Director of Crisis Management)
 Nate Church (National Executive Director and Advisory Councilor)
 Mark Helling (Advisory Council)
 Harry Parker (Advisory Council)
 Scott Wilson (Advisory Council)
 John Sandwell (Advisory Council)
 David Prueher (Advisory Council)
 Shawn Head (Advisory Council)
 Travis Steinke (Advisory Council)
 Dustin Blankenshiip (Advisory Council)

In addition, longtime supporters and former Phi Sigma Epsilon National Presidents Dean Rockwell, (originally of Eastern Michigan's Lambda chapter '35 and 's National President 1950–1958) and John Sandwell, (originally of Fort Hays State's Zeta chapter '71 and 's National President 1978–1984) added their advice and experience to all areas of Phi Sigma Phi's new operations.

The foundation for Phi Sigma Phi stems from a desire to keep alive many of the ideals of Phi Sigma Epsilon, and chose to form the National Fraternity with founding Chapters, and not specifically Founding Fathers. Still, the creation of Phi Sigma Phi was driven by its Alumni volunteers.  The chapters opposed to the merger determined which groups would form the new national fraternity.  By  there existed seven chapters which became the foundation of the new organization.  These seven chapters are known by the Fraternity as the "Founding Seven" chapters:
 Lambda ( chapter, Eastern Michigan University, Ypsilanti, Michigan
 Omega chapter, University of Wisconsin–Stout, Menomonie, Wisconsin
 Phi Beta chapter, University of Wisconsin–Eau Claire, Eau Claire, Wisconsin
 Phi Iota chapter, Northland College, Ashland, Wisconsin
 Phi Kappa chapter, West Virginia Wesleyan College, Buckhannon, West Virginia  
 Phi Mu chapter, Concord University, Athens, West Virginia
 Sigma Zeta chapter, University of Wisconsin–River Falls, River Falls, Wisconsin

Although there was strong support for this new fraternity from many campuses and alumni, the first years of Phi Sigma Phi's existence were difficult. During the years of  through , the National Fraternity struggled for survival, and expansion was non-existent. Establishing new national programs, publications, visitations, and a new financial program were top priorities and took most of the new national Fraternity's energy and efforts. The dawn of the s saw Phi Sigma Phi settle into its position as that of a strong and determined new national fraternity. The National Council and Staff of Phi Sigma Phi were determined to chart a course for this new national fraternity where the emphasis was on superior service and support for the membership. The initial turmoil of the late s gradually settled, and the desire and drive for expansion was put into action.

Mission and Philanthropy
Phi Sigma Phi is a partnering organization with the President's Council on Service and Civic Participation.  
This partnership was first implemented by Doug Renshaw at the Epsilon Zeta chapter at Fairmont State University and was expanded to a national effort at the July 2015 National Leadership Development Academy in Morgantown, West Virginia.

Chapters

Active:
 Omega chapter, 1988–present, University of Wisconsin-Stout, Menomonie, WI
 Epsilon Nu chapter, 2005–present, York College of Pennsylvania, York, PA
 Kappa chapter, 2012–present, University of Wisconsin-Stevens Point, Stevens Point, WI
 Epsilon Chi chapter, 2018–present, West Virginia University, Morgantown, WV
 Alpha Epsilon chapter, 2021–present, University of Wisconsin - Madison, Madison, WI

Inactive:
 Lambda chapter, 1988–2023, Eastern Michigan University, Ypsilanti, MI
 Phi Beta chapter, 1988-~2011, University of Wisconsin-Eau Claire, Eau Claire, WI 
 Phi Kappa chapter, 1988-1997, West Virginia Wesleyan College, Buckhannon, WV
 Sigma Zeta chapter, 1988-1994, University of Wisconsin-River Falls, River Falls, WI 
 Epsilon Alpha chapter, 1991-1997, Michigan State University, East Lansing, MI 
 Xi chapter, 1995–2023, Central Michigan University, Mt. Pleasant, MI
 Epsilon Beta chapter, 1996–2023, Wright State University, Dayton, OH
 Epsilon Delta chapter, 1998-19xx, Bluefield State College, Bluefield, WV 
 Epsilon Eta chapter, 1988-1995, Southeastern Oklahoma State University, Durant, OK 
 Epsilon Kappa chapter, 19xx-19xx, Johnson & Wales University, Providence, RI 
 Epsilon Xi chapter, 19xx-19xx, Long Island University, Brooklyn, NY 
 Sigma Psi colony(?), 19xx-19xx, University of Minnesota-Duluth, Duluth, MN 
 Phi Pi colony, 19xx-19xx, University of Wisconsin-Superior, Superior, WI 
 Epsilon Tau colony, 2016-2016, University of Nebraska-Lincoln, Lincoln, NE
 Epsilon Sigma colony, 2016-2018, Penn State University, State College, PA
 Epsilon Omicron chapter, 2011–2018, Penn State Harrisburg, Lower Swatara Township, PA
 Phi Mu chapter, 1988–2022, Concord University, Athens, WV
 Epsilon Lambda chapter, 2009–2022, University of Michigan-Dearborn, Dearborn, MI
 Epsilon Zeta chapter, 2000–2022, Fairmont State University, Fairmont, WV

See also
 List of social fraternities and sororities

Notes

External links
 Phi Sigma Phi National Site

References

Student organizations established in 1988
North American Interfraternity Conference
Student societies in the United States
1988 establishments in Indiana